Midvale is an unincorporated community in Yakima County, Washington, United States, located immediately south of Sunnyside.

The community was named Midvale by the Union Pacific Railroad because of its location midway between Mabton and Sunnyside.

References

Northern Pacific Railway
Unincorporated communities in Yakima County, Washington
Unincorporated communities in Washington (state)